Koroivos B.C. or Koroivos Amaliadas B.C. (alternate spellings: Koroibos Amaliada) (Greek: Κόροιβος Αμαλιάδας KAE), is a Greek professional basketball club that is based in Amaliada, Greece. The club's full name is Athlitikos Syllogos Amaliadas Koroivos (Αθλητικός Σύλλογος Αμαλιάδας Κόροιβος), which is also abbreviated as A.S.A. Koroivos (Α.Σ.Α. Κόροιβος) and it maintains different sport departments. The club's name is in honour of the first stadion race winner of the Ancient Olympic Games, Coroebus of Elis.

Club branding

History
The parent athletic club of Koroivos was founded in 1982, and the club's basketball section was founded in 1983. In 2010, Koroivos merged with Xanthi and gained Xanthi's club rights, and also took their place in the Greek 2nd Division during the 2010–11 season. Koroivos also took AEK Athens' place in the Greek 2nd Division during the 2012–13 season.

Koroivos finished in 2nd place in the Greek 2nd Division in the 2013–14 season, after Sakis Karidas hit a 3 pointer at the end of the game against Kavala, to give Koroivos a 58 to 57 win in the next to last game of the season. The club thus gained promotion to play in the top Greek League for the first time in the 2014–15 season.

Arenas
Koroivos plays their home games at the 2,000 seat Amaliada Ilida Indoor Hall.

Season by season

Roster

Notable players

Greece:
  Tasos Charismidis
  Dimitris Charitopoulos
  Georgios Galiotos
  Michalis Giannakidis
  Sotiris Gioulekas
  Nikos Kaklamanos
  Andreas Kanonidis
  Sakis Karidas
  Marios Matalon
  Petros Noeas
  Nikos Pettas
  Panagiotis Vasilopoulos

Europe:
  Aleksandar Ćapin
  Fedor Dmitriev
  Andreja Milutinović
 - Obie Trotter
 - Devon van Oostrum
  Saša Vasiljević
USA:
  Ken Brown
  Vincent Council
  Dwayne Davis
  Toddrick Gotcher
  Kenny Hall
 - Darrell Harris
  Robert Lowery
  Josh Magette
  Devonta Pollard

Africa:
 - Darrius Garrett
  Harding Nana

Oceania:
  Corey Webster

Head coaches
  Charis Markopoulos
  Dinos Kalampakos

References

External links
Official Website 
Eurobasket.com Team Profile

1983 establishments in Greece
Basketball teams established in 1983
Basketball teams in Greece
Elis
Multi-sport clubs in Greece